Amazon Bay Rural LLG is a local-level government (LLG) of Central Province, Papua New Guinea.

Wards
01. Doriodua
02. Banaoro 
03. Losoa
04. Bogea
05. Launoga
06. Ade/Ebu
07. Barauoro
08. Goiseoro
09. Danava
10. Daena
11. Warumen
12. Abasi
13. Malaoro
14. Kenene
15. Nonou
16. Aloke

References

Local-level governments of Central Province (Papua New Guinea)